Sonkuriha, 'Suvarnakundya' in ancient times, is a village in Nalbari district of Western Assam.

Etymology 
The modern name is derived from Sanskrit form 'Suvarnakundya', the ancient name of the area.

History 
The arthashastra of Kautilya mentioned flourishing trade with Kamrup. He mentioned finest sik of his times was produced in Sonkuriha (Suvarnakundya). It also produced a special perfume named 'Tailaparnika', which also produced in at least six other places within Kamrup region. The Kamrup also produced Chandana and Aguru products at that time.

Like rest of Kamrup region, language used in Sonkuriha is Assamese language.

Festivals

Domahi, Amati, Durga Puja, Kali Puja (Shyama Puja, Diwali), Holi, Janmastami, Shivratri etc. are major festivals of the village. Vedic culture is widespread in day-to-day life.

Transport

The village is well connected to

See also

 Villages of Nalbari District

References

Bibliography

External links
 

Villages in Nalbari district